TDM IP Holder, LLC. , doing business as Taco Del Mar, is a Denver, Colorado-based Mexican fast casual restaurant chain that specializes in coastal Mexican cuisine.  The first Taco Del Mar was opened in Seattle on June 8, 1992, by brothers James and John Schmidt. After a high of 260 locations in 2010, it has downgraded to only 66 locations in the United States and Canada. It is known for its relaxed, seaside-themed decor inspired by the beaches of Baja California.

The name "Taco del Mar," ("taco of the sea" in Spanish), refers to the chain's original specialty – Baja fish tacos.  Like the larger Subway chain, customers direct the preparation of their meal, requesting ingredients along an assembly line. A standard selection of Fresh Mex ingredients is available, including wheat, flour, tomatoes, or spinach tortillas, and fish, beef, pork, or chicken.

In 2018, Taco Del Mar was acquired by High Bluff Capital Partners.

Executive resignations
In November 2007, Taco del Mar Franchising Corp President David Huether resigned. Less than one month later, Neal Hollingsworth, Taco del Mar's VP of Franchising Sales also resigned and left the Seattle/Tacoma area.

2008 explosion in Vancouver
During the early morning hours of February 13, 2008, a Taco del Mar franchise in Vancouver, British Columbia was destroyed by a large explosion which damaged several nearby businesses. Police confirmed that the blast was caused by an arsonist who had placed an accelerant inside the restaurant, then set it on fire. Vancouver-area police later arrested Kamal Jeet Singh Josan, suffering from burns to over 40% of his body. The motive for this act was not publicly known. In April 2009, charges against Josan were stayed due to lack of evidence. Prosecutors took up the file again in January 2010, and Josan pleaded guilty to one charge of arson on March 14, 2011. Josan was sentenced to two years of house arrest on June 13, 2011.

2010 bankruptcy filing
On Friday, January 22, 2010, Taco del Mar filed for Chapter 11 bankruptcy protection in Seattle. Among its major creditors were Suzanne Todd, a franchisee in Maryland, with a disputed claim for $500,000; Paul & Shahnaz Hendifar, with a $125,416 judgment entered in Texas; Canada Revenue Agency, with a $105,324 tax claim, and the city of Seattle, with a $95,289 claim for taxes.

Taco del Mar was auctioned in a bankruptcy sale on September 30, 2010, and the winning bid of $3.25 million came from Connecticut company Franchise Brands LLC. Franchise Brands was created in 2005 by Fred DeLuca and Peter Buck, the founders of Subway restaurants. Both Subway and Franchise Brands LLC are based in Milford, Connecticut.

On July 10, 2018, Taco del Mar was sold to High Bluff Capital Partners, the owners of Subway's longtime competitor Quiznos.

References

External links
 Official website

Cuisine of the Western United States
Fast-food chains of the United States
Fast casual restaurants
Fast-food Mexican restaurants
Restaurants in Seattle
Restaurant chains in the United States
Restaurants established in 1992
American companies established in 1992
1992 establishments in Washington (state)
Companies that filed for Chapter 11 bankruptcy in 2010
Companies based in Denver